Edward Harry Greenfield OBE (3 July 1928 – 1 July 2015) was an English music critic and broadcaster.

Early life
Edward Greenfield was born in Westcliff-on-Sea, Essex. His father, Percy Greenfield, was a manager in a labour exchange, while his mother, Mabel, was a clerk. He was briefly evacuated to Belper in Derbyshire when the Second World War began. He attended Westcliff High School for Boys, and then did two years of National Service. During his service, which began in 1947, he was with the Royal Army Educational Corps, where he was promoted to sergeant. He was deployed with the British Army of the Rhine in Germany.

He went to Trinity Hall, Cambridge, to study modern languages, but ended up graduating in law.

Career
Greenfield joined The Manchester Guardian in 1953, where he began as a filing clerk. He then became a lobby correspondent in the House of Commons.

He was a record critic for the newspaper from 1955, a music critic from 1964, and was chief music critic from 1977 until his retirement in 1993. He contributed to Gramophone magazine from 1960, and was joint editor of The Stereo Record Guide after 1960.

A regular broadcaster on the BBC, he presented classical music programmes on the World Service, including his selection of music and requests on The Greenfield Collection, and was a regular contributor to the Building a Library feature of Radio 3's Record Review for many years.

Greenfield was appointed OBE in 1994. In 2002 he was elected as the Master of the Art Workers' Guild.

Later life and death
In 2010, Greenfield entered into a civil partnership with Paul Westcott, a press officer at Chandos Records.

In his later years, he suffered from an undiagnosed condition that affected his balance and rendered him immobile. He died at his home in Spitalfields, London, on 1 July 2015, two days before his 87th birthday.

Books
 
 
 
 (with Ivan March, Paul Czajkowski, Robert Layton)

References

External links

1928 births
2015 deaths
20th-century British Army personnel
Alumni of Trinity Hall, Cambridge
BBC Radio 3 presenters
Classical music critics
English LGBT people
English music critics
Masters of the Art Worker's Guild
Military personnel from Southend-on-Sea
Officers of the Order of the British Empire
People educated at Westcliff High School for Boys
People from Westcliff-on-Sea
Royal Army Educational Corps soldiers
The Guardian journalists